Wa ʿalaykumu s-salam is an Arabic greeting often used by Muslims around the world translating to "may peace be upon you". It is a blessing given to another.  It is  the standard response to the As-salamu alaykum greeting. The greetings are intentional communications to acknowledge someone's presence or to make someone feel welcomed. They are used prior to a conversation and are said to be good manners. The greeting is considered an important Islamic duty and obligation. "Salam" has been a standard salutation among Muslims. The greeting is regularly exchanged during Muslim lectures and sermons. The complete form is "Wa ʿalaykumu s-salāmu wa-raḥmatu -llāhi wa-barakātuh" ("And upon you be peace, as well as the mercy of God and his blessings").

Literary meaning 
"Salam" literally means "peace". The word "Islam" is also derived from it. In a wider sense "salam" means harmlessness, safety and protection from evil and from faults. As-Salaam is also one of the Names of Allah.

Islamic rules related to the use of salaam 

The greeting should be used both when arriving and when leaving. It was reported that Abu Hurayrah said "When one of you joins a gathering, let him say salaam. When he wants to get up and leave, let him say salaam. The former is not more important than the latter." (Hasan hadith reported in Jāmi` al-Tirmidhi.)

According to hadith, Muhammad was asked who should "begin" the salam greeting and he said:

The one who is riding should greet the one who is walking and the one who is walking should greet the one who is sitting and the smaller group should greet the larger group.
— Saheeh - Al-Bukhaari, 6234; Muslim, 2160

It is also stated that one should give the Salam greeting upon entering a house. This is based upon the verse of the Qur'an:

But when you enter the houses, greet one another with a greeting from Allah (i.e. say: Assalaamu ‘Aleykum—peace be on you), blessed and good.
— Al-Noor 24:61

Religious scholars differ as to whether Muslims may initiate the saying of salaam to members of other faiths. The Qur'an says: "When you are greeted with a greeting, greet in return with what is better than it, or (at least) return it equally" (al-Nisa’ 4:86).

Usage

In other languages

See also 
 Peace be upon him
 Peace be with you
 Shalom aleichem

References 

Arabic words and phrases in Sharia
Greeting words and phrases
Islamic terminology